Can Lộc is a rural district of Hà Tĩnh province in the North Central Coast region of Vietnam. As of 2003 the district had a population of 180,931. The district covers an area of 378 km². The district capital lies at Nghèn.

References

Districts of Hà Tĩnh province